Argenis Antonio Salazar Yepez (born November 4, 1961) is a former shortstop in Major League Baseball who played for the Montreal Expos (1983–84), Kansas City Royals (1986–87) and Chicago Cubs (1988). He batted and threw right-handed.

Salazar, who was known by the nickname "Angel", was signed by Montreal as an amateur free agent in 1980. He made his debut in the 1983 season.

Following a long string of shortstops coming from Venezuela, Salazar had below average range but compensated somewhat with a strong and accurate arm. He struggled with the bat,  most of time near the Mendoza Line.

In 1984, Salazar had arguably the worst season in MLB history by a regular starter.  In 80 games, he had a batting average of .155 and an adjusted OPS of 9 (League average being 100).  He wasn't much better on the base-paths, having one stolen base and one caught stealing (matching his career stolen base percentage of 50%).  And while Salazar had a reputation as a good fielding shortstop, in reality both his range factor and fielding percentage were well below the league average of shortstops in 1984.

In a five-year career, Salazar had 188 hits, with 2 home runs and 59 RBI in 886 at bats.

See also
 List of Major League Baseball players from Venezuela

External links
 Career statistics at Baseball Reference

1961 births
Living people
Calgary Expos players
Chicago Cubs players
Indianapolis Indians players
Kansas City Royals players
Montreal Expos players
Major League Baseball players from Venezuela
Major League Baseball shortstops
People from Anzoátegui
Salinas Spurs players
Tiburones de La Guaira players
Tidewater Tides players
Venezuelan expatriate baseball players in Canada
Venezuelan expatriate baseball players in the United States
West Palm Beach Expos players
Wichita Aeros players
Venezuelan expatriate baseball players in Italy